Uralsky is a closed urban locality (a settlement) in Sverdlovsk Oblast, Russia, located  southeast of Yekaterinburg. Population:

Administrative and municipal status
Within the framework of the administrative divisions, it is incorporated as the closed administrative-territorial formation of Uralsky—an administrative unit with the status equal to that of the districts. As a municipal division, the closed administrative-territorial formation of Uralsky is incorporated as Uralsky Urban Okrug.

References

Notes

Sources

Urban-type settlements in Sverdlovsk Oblast

